The St-Isidore Eagles are a ice hockey team based out of St. Isidore, Ontario.  They play in the National Capital Junior Hockey League. There main colour is green white and black

Season-by-season record
Note: GP = Games Played, W = Wins, L = Losses, T = Ties, OTL = Overtime Losses, GF = Goals for, GA = Goals against

Individual player awards

External links
Eagles Homepage

Eastern Ontario Junior C Hockey League teams
Ice hockey clubs established in 1974
fr:Saint-Isidore (Comté unis de Prescott et Russell)